Omar Moya is a paralympic athlete from Cuba competing mainly in category T11 sprint events.

Omar was part of the Cuban team that competed in the 1996 Summer Paralympics in Atlanta where he finished fourth in the final of the T11 100m and won gold in both the T11 200m and 400m.

References

Paralympic athletes of Cuba
Athletes (track and field) at the 1996 Summer Paralympics
Paralympic gold medalists for Cuba
Living people
Medalists at the 1996 Summer Paralympics
Year of birth missing (living people)
Paralympic medalists in athletics (track and field)
Cuban male sprinters
Visually impaired sprinters
Paralympic sprinters